Snow Storm, or Snow Storm: Steam-Boat off a Harbour's Mouth, (full title: Snow Storm – Steam-Boat off a Harbour's Mouth Making Signals in Shallow Water, and going by the Lead. The Author was in this Storm on the Night the "Ariel" left Harwich) is a painting by English artist Joseph Mallord William Turner (1775–1851) from 1842.

Though panned by many contemporary critics, critic John Ruskin commented in 1843 that it was "one of the very grandest statements of sea-motion, mist and light, that has ever been put on canvas".

The painting was also shown in "My Policeman", a movie directed by Michael Grandage starring David Dawson, Emma Corrin and Harry Styles.

History

An inscription on the painting relates that The Author was in this Storm on the Night the "Ariel" left Harwich. Turner later recounted a story about the background of the painting: 

He was 67 years old at the time. Some later commentators doubt the literal truth of this account. Other critics accept Turner's account, and one wrote, "He empathized completely with the dynamic form of sovereign nature."
This inscription allows us to better understand the scene represented and the confusion of elements.

Turner had investigated the interactions between nature and the new technology of steamboats in at least five paintings in the previous decade. Throughout his career, Turner engaged with issues of urbanism, industry, railroads and steam power. The paddle steamer "Ariel" was formerly called the "Arrow", being built in 1821–22. In 1837 she was acquired by the Admiralty and renamed "Ariel", and was used as the Dover packet up to 1846.

Early critical response to the painting was largely negative, with one critic calling it "soapsuds and whitewash". John Ruskin, the leading English art critic of the Victorian era, though, wrote in 1843 in his book Modern Painters that the painting was "one of the very grandest statements of sea-motion, mist and light, that has ever been put on canvas." Reportedly Turner was hurt by the criticism, repeating "soapsuds and whitewash" over and over again, and saying, "What would they have? I wonder what they think the sea's like? I wish they'd been in it". Ruskin commented, "It is thus, too often, that ignorance sits in judgment on the works of genius". More recently, art historian Alexandra Wettlaufer wrote that the painting is one of Turner's "most famous, and most obscure, sublime depictions".

Currently in the collection of the Tate in London, it was on exhibition at the De Young Museum in San Francisco in 2015.

Painting

The painting depicts a paddle steamer caught in a snow storm. This marine painting is showing a Romantic era's painter's depiction of a snowstorm on water at its best, fully developing the bold, daring Romantic fantasy of Turner. Turner was unrivaled in depicting the natural world unmastered by mankind and exploring the effects of the elements and the battle of the forces of the nature. Turner worked first as a watercolorist, and he started to work much later with oils. He later applied the techniques he learned in watercolour onto oil paintings.

It is typical of the late style of Turner. Turner's tints and shades of colours are painted in different layers of colour, the brushstrokes adding texture to the painting.  The colours are monochromatic, only a few shades of grey, green and brown are present, having the same tone of colours. The silvery pale light that surrounds the boat creates a focal point, drawing the viewer into the painting. The smoke from the steamboat spreads out over the sky, creating abstract shapes of the same quality like the waves.

See also
Snow Storm: Hannibal and his Army Crossing the Alps, another Turner painting

References

Citations

Bibliography

1842 paintings
Paintings by J. M. W. Turner
Maritime paintings
Romantic paintings
Collection of the Tate galleries